Elections in the Free Hanseatic City of Bremen (Freie Hansestadt Bremen) to its state parliament, the Bürgerschaft, during the Weimar Republic were held at variable intervals between 1919 and 1930. Results with regard to the total vote, the percentage of the vote won and the number of seats allocated to each party are presented in the tables below. On 31 March 1933, the sitting Bürgerschaft was dissolved by the Nazi-controlled central government and reconstituted to reflect the distribution of seats in the national Reichstag. The Bürgerschaft subsequently was formally abolished as a result of the "Law on the Reconstruction of the Reich" of 30 January 1934 which replaced the German federal system with a unitary state.

1919
The 1919 Bremen state election was held on 9 March 1919 to elect the 200 members of the Bremen National Assembly.

1920
The 1920 Bremen state election was held on 6 June 1920 to elect the 120 members of the Bürgerschaft.

1921
The 1921 Bremen state election was held on 20 February 1921 to elect the 120 members of the Bürgerschaft.

1923
The 1923 Bremen state election was held on 18 November 1923 to elect the 120 members of the Bürgerschaft.

1924
The 1924 Bremen state election was held on 7 December 1924 to elect the 120 members of the Bürgerschaft.

1927
The 1927 Bremen state election was held on 13 November 1927 to elect the 120 members of the Bürgerschaft.

1930
The 1930 Bremen state election was held on 30 November 1930 to elect the 80 members of the Bürgerschaft.

References

Elections in Bremen (state)
Elections in the Weimar Republic
Bremen
Bremen
Bremen
Bremen
Bremen
Bremen
Bremen